The compilation of a unified list of computer viruses is made difficult because of naming. To aid the fight against computer viruses and other types of malicious software, many security advisory organizations and developers of anti-virus software compile and publish lists of viruses. When a new virus appears, the rush begins to identify and understand it as well as develop appropriate counter-measures to stop its propagation. Along the way, a name is attached to the virus.  As the developers of anti-virus software compete partly based on how quickly they react to the new threat, they usually study and name the viruses independently.  By the time the virus is identified, many names denote the same virus.

Another source of ambiguity in names is that sometimes a virus initially identified as a completely new virus is found to be a variation of an earlier known virus, in which cases, it is often renamed.  For example, the second variation of the Sobig worm was initially called "Palyh" but later renamed "Sobig.b".  Again, depending on how quickly this happens, the old name may persist.

Scope 
In terms of scope, there are two major variants: the list of "in-the-wild" viruses, which list viruses in active circulation, and lists of all known viruses, which also contain viruses believed not to be in active circulation (also called "zoo viruses").  The sizes are vastly different: in-the-wild lists contain a hundred viruses but full lists contain tens of thousands.

Comparison of viruses and related programs 
{|class="wikitable sortable" border="1"
!Virus
!Alias(es)
!Types
!Subtype
!Isolation Date
!Isolation
!Origin 
!Author 
!Notes
|-
|1260
|V2Px
|DOS
|Polymorphic
|1990
|
|
|
|First virus family to use polymorphic encryption
|-
|4K
|4096 
|DOS
|
|1990-01
|
|
|
|The first known MS-DOS-file-infector to use stealth
|-
|5lo
|
|DOS
|
|1992-10
|
|
|
|Infects .EXE files only
|-
|Abraxas
|Abraxas5
|DOS,Windows 95, 98
|
|1993-04
|Europe
|
|ARCV group
|Infects COM file. Disk directory listing will be set to the system date and time when infection occurred.
|-
|Acid
|Acid.670, Acid.670a, Avatar.Acid.670, Keeper.Acid.670
|DOS,Windows 95, 98
|
|1992
|
|
|Corp-$MZU
|Infects COM file. Disk directory listing will not be altered.
|-
|Acme
|
|DOS,Windows 95 DOS
|
|1992
|
|
|
|Upon executing infected EXE, this infects another EXE in current directory by making a hidden COM file with same base name.
|-
|ABC
|ABC-2378, ABC.2378, ABC.2905
|DOS
|
|1992-10
|
|
|
|ABC causes keystrokes on the compromised machine to be repeated.
|- 
|Actifed
|
|DOS
|
|
|
|
|
|
|- 
|Ada
|
|DOS
|
|1991-10
|
|Argentina
|
|The Ada virus mainly targets .COM files, specifically COMMAND.COM.
|- 
|AGI-Plan
|Month 4-6
|DOS
|
|
|Mülheim
|
|
|AGI-Plan is notable for reappearing in South Africa in what appeared to be an intentional re-release.
|- 
|AI
|
|DOS
|
|
|
|
|
|
|- 
|AIDS
|AIDSB, Hahaha, Taunt
|DOS
|
|1990
|
|
|
|AIDS is the first virus known to exploit the DOS "corresponding file" vulnerability.
|- 
|AIDS II
|
|DOS
|
|circa 1990
|
|
|
|
|-
|Alabama
|Alabama.B 
|DOS
|
|1989-10
|
|Hebrew University, Jerusalem
|
|Files infected by Alabama increase in size by 1,560 bytes.
|-
|Alcon
|RSY, Kendesm, Ken&Desmond, Ether
|DOS
|
|1997-12
|
|
|
|Overwrites random information on disk causing damage over time.
|-
|Ambulance
|
|DOS
|
|June,1990
|
|
|
|
|-
|Anna Kournikova
|
|E-MailVBScript
|
|2001-02-11
|
|Sneek, Netherlands
|Jan de Wit
|A Dutch court stated that US$166,000 in damages was caused by the worm.
|-
|ANTI
|ANTI-A, ANTI-ANGE, ANTI-B, Anti-Variant
|Classic Mac OS
|
|1989-02
|France
|
|
|The first Mac OS virus not to create additional resources; instead, it patches existing CODE resources.
|-
|AntiCMOS
|
|DOS
|
|January 1994 – 1995
|
|
|
|Due to a bug in the virus code, the virus fails to erase CMOS information as intended.
|-
|ARCV-n
|
|DOS
|
|1992-10/1992-11
|
|England, United Kingdom
|ARCV Group
|ARCV-n is a term for a large family of viruses written by the ARCV group.
|-
|Alureon
|TDL-4, TDL-1, TDL-2, TDL-3, TDL-TDSS
|Windows
|Botnet
|2007
|
|Estonia
|JD virus
|
|-
|Autostart
|Autostart.A—D
|Classic Mac OS
|
|1998
|Hong Kong
|China
|
|
|-
|Bomber
|CommanderBomber
|DOS
|
|
|
|Bulgaria
|
|Polymorphic virus which infects systems by inserting fragments of its code randomly into executable files.
|-
|Brain
|Pakistani flu
|DOS
|Boot sector virus
|1986-01
|
|Lahore, Pakistan
|Basit and Amjad Farooq Alvi
|Considered to be the first computer virus for the PC
|- 
|Byte Bandit
|
|Amiga
|Boot sector virus
|1988-01
|
|
|Swiss Cracking Association
|It was one of the most feared Amiga viruses until the infamous Lamer Exterminator.
|-
|CDEF
|
|Classic Mac OS
|
|1990.08
|
|Ithaca, New York
|
|Cdef arrives on a system from an infected Desktop file on removable media. It does not infect any Macintosh systems beyond OS6.
|-
|Christmas Tree
|
|
|Worm
|1987-12
|
|Germany
|
|
|-
|CIH
|Chernobyl, Spacefiller
|Windows 95, 98, Me
|
|1998-06
|Taiwan
|Taiwan
|Chen ing-Hau
|Activates on April 26, in which it destroys partition tables, and tries to overwrite the BIOS.
|-
|Commwarrior
|
|Symbian Bluetooth worm
|
|
|
|
|
|Famous for being the first worm to spread via MMS and Bluetooth.
|- 
|Creeper
|
|TENEX operating system
|Worm
|1971
|
|
|Bob Thomas
|An experimental self-replicating program which gained access via the ARPANET and copied itself to the remote system.
|-
|Eliza
|
|DOS
|
|1991-12
|
|
|
|
|- 
|Elk Cloner
|
|Apple II
|
|1982
|Mt. Lebanon, Pennsylvania
|Mt. Lebanon, Pennsylvania
|Rich Skrenta
|The first virus observed "in the wild"
|-
|Esperanto
|
|DOS, MS Windows, Classic Mac OS
|
|1997.11
|Spain
|Spain
|Mister Sandman
|First multi-processor virus. The virus is capable of infecting files on computers running Microsoft Windows and DOS on the x86 processor and MacOS, whether they are on a Motorola or PowerPC processor.
|-
|Form
|
|DOS
|
|1990
|Switzerland
|
|
|A very common boot virus, triggers on the 18th of any month.
|-
|Fun
|
|Windows
|
|2008
|
|
|
| It registers itself as a Windows system process then periodically sends mail with spreading attachments as a response to any unopened emails in Outlook Express
|-
|Graybird
|Backdoor.GrayBird, BackDoor-ARR
|Windows
|Trojan Horse
|2003-02-04
|
|
|
|
|- 
|Hare
|
|DOS,Windows 95, Windows 98
|
|1996-08
|
|
|
|Famous for press coverage which blew its destructiveness out of proportion
|-
|ILOVEYOU
|
|Microsoft
|Worm
|2000-05-05
|
|Manila, Philippines
|Michael Buen, Onel de Guzman
|Computer worm that attacked tens of millions of Windows personal computers
|-
|INIT 1984
|
|Classic Mac OS
|
|1992-03-13
|Ireland
|
|
|Malicious, triggered on Friday the 13th.  Init1984 works on Classic Mac OS System 6 and 7.

|-
|Jerusalem
|
|DOS
|
|1987-10
|
|
|
|Jerusalem was initially very common and spawned a large number of variants.
|-
|Kama Sutra
|Blackworm, Nyxem, and Blackmal
|
|
|2006-01-16
|
|
|
|Designed to destroy common files such as Microsoft Word, Excel, and PowerPoint documents.
|-
|Koko
|
|DOS
|
|1991-03
|
|
|
|The payload of this virus activates on July 29 and February 15 and may erase data on the users hard drive
|-
|Lamer Exterminator
|
|Amiga
|Boot sector virus
|1989-10
|
|Germany
|
|Random encryption, fills random sector with "LAMER"
|-
|MacMag
|Drew, Bradow, Aldus, Peace
|Classic Mac OS
|
|1987-12
|
|United States
|
|Products (not necessarily the Classic Mac OS) were infected with the first actual virus.
|-
|MDEF
|Garfield, Top Cat
|Classic Mac OS
|
|1990-05-15
|
|Ithaca, New York
|
|Infects menu definition resource fork files. Mdef infects all Classic Mac OS versions from 4.1 to 6.
|-
|Melissa
|Mailissa, Simpsons, Kwyjibo, Kwejeebo
|Microsoft Word macro virus
|
|1999-03-26
|
|New Jersey
|David L. Smith
|Part macro virus and part worm. Melissa, a MS Word-based macro that replicates itself through e-mail.
|-
|Mirai
|
|Internet of Things
|DDoS
|2016
|
|
|
|
|-
|Michelangelo
|
|DOS
|
|1991-02-04
|Australia
|
|
|Ran March 6 (Michelangelo's birthday)

|-
|Mydoom
|Novarg, Mimail, Shimgapi
|Windows
|Worm
|2004-01-26
|World
|Russia
|
|Mydoom was the world's fastest spreading computer worm to date, surpassing Sobig, and the ILOVEYOU computer worms, yet it was used to DDoS servers.
|-
||Navidad
|
|Windows
|Mass-mailer worm
|2000-12
|
|South America
|
|
|-
|Natas
|Natas.4740, Natas.4744, Natas.4774, Natas.4988
|DOS
|Multipartite, stealth, polymorphic
|1994.06
|Mexico City
|United States
|Priest (AKA Little Loc)
|
|-
|nVIR
|MODM, nCAM, nFLU, kOOL, Hpat, Jude, Mev#, nVIR.B
|Classic Mac OS
|
|1987-12
|
|United States
|
|nVIR has been known to 'hybridize' with different variants of nVIR on the same machine.
|-
|Oompa
|Leap
|Mac OSX
|Worm
|2006.02.10
|
|
|
|First worm for Mac OSX. It propagates through iChat, an instant message client for Macintosh operating systems. Whether Oompa is a worm has been controversial. Some believe it is a trojan.
|-
|OneHalf
|Slovak Bomber, Freelove or Explosion-II
|DOS
|
|1994
|
|Slovakia
|Vyvojar
|It is also known as one of the first viruses to implement a technique of "patchy infection"
|- 
|NoEscape.exe
|
|Windows
|
|
|
|
|-
|Ontario.1024
|
|
|
|
|
|
|
|
|-
|Ontario.2048
|
|
|
|
|
|
|
|
|- 
|Ontario
|SBC
|DOS
|
|1990-07
|
|Ontario
|"Death Angel"
|
|-
|Petya
|GoldenEye, NotPetya
|Windows
|Trojan horse
|2016
|Ukraine
|Russia
|
|Total damages brought about by NotPetya to more than $10 billion.
|-
|Pikachu virus
|
|
|
|2000-06-28
|
|Asia
|
|The Pikachu virus is believed to be the first computer virus geared at children.
|- 
|Ping-pong
| Boot, Bouncing Ball, Bouncing Dot, Italian, Italian-A, VeraCruz
| DOS
|Boot sector virus
|1988-03
|
|Turin
|
| Harmless to most computers
|-
|RavMonE.exe
|RJump.A, Rajump, Jisx
|Worm
|
|2006-06-20
|
|
|
|Once distributed in Apple iPods, but a Windows-only virus
|-
|SCA
|
|Amiga
|Boot sector virus
|1987-11
|
|Switzerland
|Swiss Cracking Association
|Puts a message on screen.  Harmless except it might destroy a legitimate non-standard boot block.
|-
|Scores
|Eric, Vult, NASA, San Jose Flu
|Classic Mac OS
|
|1988.04
|United States
|Fort Worth, Texas
|Donald D. Burleson
|Designed to attack two specific applications which were never released.
|- 
|Scott's Valley
|
|DOS
|
|1990-09
|Scotts Valley, California
|
|
|Infected files will contain the seemingly meaningless hex string 5E8BDE909081C63200B912082E.
|-
|SevenDust
|666, MDEF, 9806, Graphics Accelerator, SevenD, SevenDust.B—G
|Classic Mac OS
|Polymorphic
|1989-06
|
|
|
|-
|Marker
|Shankar's Virus, Marker.C, Marker.O, Marker.Q, Marker.X, Marker.AQ, Marker.BN, Marker.BO, Marker.DD, Marker.GR, W97M.Marker
|MS Word
|Polymorphic, Macro virus
|1999-06-03
|
|
|Sam Rogers
|Infects Word Documents
|-
|Simile
|Etap, MetaPHOR
|Windows
|Polymorphic
|
|
|
|The Mental Driller
|The metamorphic code accounts for around 90% of the virus' code
|-
|SMEG engine
|
|DOS
|Polymorphic
|1994
|
|United Kingdom
|The Black Baron
|Two viruses were created using the engine: Pathogen and Queeg.
|-
|Stoned
|
|DOS
|Boot sector virus
|1987
|Wellington
|
|
|One of the earliest and most prevalent boot sector viruses
|-
|Jerusalem
|Sunday, Jerusalem-113, Jeruspain, Suriv, Sat13, FuManchu
|DOS
|File virus
|1987-10
|Seattle
|
|
|Virus coders created many variants of the virus, making Jerusalem one of the largest families of viruses ever created. It even includes many sub-variants and a few sub-sub-variants. 
|-
|WannaCry
|WannaCrypt, WannaCryptor
|Windows
|Ransomware Cryptoworm
|2017
|World
|North Korea
|
|
|-
|WDEF
|WDEF A
|Classic Mac OS
|
|1989.12.15
|
|
|
|Given the unique nature of the virus, its origin is uncertain.
|-
|Whale
|
|DOS
|Polymorphic
|1990-07-01
|
|Hamburg
|R Homer
|At 9216 bytes, was for its time the largest virus ever discovered.
|-
|ZMist
|ZMistfall, ZombieMistfall
|Windows
|
|2001
|
|Russia
|Z0mbie
|It was the first virus to use a technique known as "code integration".
|-
|Xafecopy
|
|Android
|Trojan
|2017
|
|
|
|
|-
|Zuc
|Zuc.A., Zuc.B, Zuc.C
|Classic Mac OS
|
|1990.03
|Italy
|Italy
|
|
|-
|}

Related lists 
List of computer worms
Timeline of computer viruses and worms

Unusual subtypes 
Palm OS viruses
HyperCard viruses
Linux malware

Notable instances 
Conficker
Creeper virus - The first malware that ran on ARPANET
ILOVEYOU
Leap - Mac OS X Trojan horse
Shamoon a wiper virus with stolen digital certificates destroyed over 35,000 computers owned by Saudi Aramco.
Storm Worm - A Windows trojan horse that forms the Storm botnet
Stuxnet First destructive ICS-targeting Trojan which destroyed part of Iran's nuclear program. The virus destroyed the centrifuge components making it impossible to enrich uranium to weapons grade.

Similar software 
Adware
Malware
Spamming
Spyware
Computer worm
Trojan horse

Security topics 
Antivirus software
Computer insecurity
Cryptovirology
Security through obscurity
Cyberwarfare

See also 
Computer worm
Spyware
Virus hoax
Zombie computer

References

External links 
The WildList, by WildList Organization International
List of Computer Viruses - listing of the Latest Viruses by Symantec.
List of all viruses All viruses cataloged in Panda Security's Collective Intelligence servers.

Computer viruses
Viruses
Viruses